The Japanese Air Force One and Japanese Air Force Two
are the radio callsigns of the two Boeing 777-300ER aircraft used by the government of Japan for overseas travel by the Emperor, Prime Minister and other high-ranking officials. Each aircraft has a capacity of 140 passengers and can be used for emergency evacuations of Japanese citizens and overseas deployment of Japan Self-Defense Forces personnel. The aircraft are operated by the Japan Air Self-Defense Force.

They have the radio callsigns Japanese Air Force One and Japanese Air Force Two when operating on official business, and Cygnus One and Cygnus Two when operating outside of official business (e.g., on training flights). The two aircraft always fly together on government missions, with one serving as the primary transport and the other serving as a backup with maintenance personnel on board. The aircraft uses the General Electric GE90-115B.

The Boeing 777-300ER replaced the original Boeing 747-400 aircraft in early 2019.

History

During the early postwar era, the Japanese government generally used the state-chartered international airline, Japan Airlines (JAL), for official trips overseas.

The Japanese government began investigating the possibility of purchasing dedicated government transport aircraft during the 1970s. Much of the impetus came from problems in using JAL: labor unions were unwilling to put aircrews at risk in missions to evacuate Japanese citizens from overseas, and often objected to transporting members of the Japan Self-Defense Forces overseas for political reasons. The privatization of JAL in the mid-1980s hastened the process.

The Cabinet of Japan decided to purchase two Boeing 747-400 aircraft in 1987 in order to have aircraft with worldwide operating range. Another goal of the 36 billion yen purchase was to counterbalance the growing trade deficit between Japan and the US.

Both aircraft were delivered in the fall of 1991 (though one source has the second delivery as being in April 1992). Kiichi Miyazawa was the first prime minister to use the 747 when he visited the US in 1993; the Emperor used the aircraft for the first time later that year.

German chancellor Gerhard Schröder joined Japanese prime minister Junichiro Koizumi aboard the aircraft in 2002 in order to attend the 2002 FIFA World Cup finals in Yokohama, to which Germany advanced while Schröder was attending a G8 summit in Canada. The operation, hastily improvised due to difficulties in flying the German government's Airbus A310 aircraft from Canada to Japan, was called "hitchhiking diplomacy" in the Japanese media. This was the first time a foreign head of government had flown on the aircraft.

The aircraft were used to transport relief workers to the area of the 2010 Canterbury earthquake in New Zealand. Foreign Minister Seiji Maehara offered use of the aircraft to evacuate Japanese nationals on the return flight, but was forced to withdraw this offer when the foreign ministry pointed out that there was not enough space for all of them on board.

In January 2011, Prime Minister Naoto Kan was criticized for using the aircraft for a trip to the World Economic Forum in Davos while 500 Japanese nationals were stranded in the midst of civil unrest in Cairo. The Weekly Asahi tabloid newspaper stated that the Foreign Ministry had requested use of the aircraft for evacuation purposes but that Kan had rejected the request citing the priority of the Davos mission. Kan denied that such a discussion had taken place, and the Foreign Ministry stated that the aircraft was not used because of the difficulty of getting landing and transit permits from various governments on short notice. Kan later considered using the aircraft for a trip to Germany to watch the Japanese team play in the finals of the 2011 FIFA Women's World Cup, but advisors dissuaded him from doing so due to the high cost and possibility of public outcry in the wake of the 2011 Tohoku earthquake and tsunami.

The Democratic Party of Japan government requested public comments about the Japanese government budget in 2011, and many responses criticized the aircraft as wasteful, suggesting that the government should switch back to charters of private aircraft as required; however, following a hostage crisis in Algeria in 2013, the Shinzo Abe government determined that the aircraft should be maintained for national security purposes.

As of August 2013, the aircraft had completed 269 missions.

Layout Boeing 747

The aircraft are painted with red and gold stripes along the fuselage and Hinomaru insignia on the tail and wings.

The aircraft contains an office area in the front-most section of the lower level, ordinarily for use by the prime minister, which may be repurposed for use by the Imperial family or other VIPs. The next cabin toward the front has lie-flat seating for senior officials (2-3-2 configuration), a separate enclosed VIP cabin with two seats, a conference table with seats that fold down into beds, and a secretarial area with office equipment. The main cabin normally functions as a seating area for reporters, with seating equivalent to airline short-haul business class seating (also 2-3-2 configuration), and has a table at the front to be used for press conferences. These cabins may be used as passenger seating on evacuation missions. The upper deck has seating equivalent to airline economy class seating (3-3 and 2-3 configuration), which is used for communications and crew rest.

Operation

Although the aircraft were initially operated by the prime minister's office as civil aircraft, they were transferred to Japan Defense Agency control in April 1992 and re-registered as defense aircraft. Each aircraft operates with a standard crew complement of 17 to 19 personnel, consisting of two to four pilots, three communications operators and twelve flight attendants.

For shorter VIP flights, the government also uses Eurocopter EC225 helicopters (GSDF 1st Helicopter Brigade) and Gulfstream IV business jets (ASDF, known as U-4 in Japanese defense parlance). The Gulfstream IV was only used as a prime ministerial aircraft once, by Yasuo Fukuda to travel from Beijing to Nagasaki at short notice when the 747 was unavailable.

Unlike the American Air Force One, the Japanese government aircraft may only be used for government business for overseas, and cannot normally be used for personal travel by the Imperial family or the prime minister.

During emergency evacuations of Japanese citizens from particularly dangerous areas overseas, personnel from the Guide Unit of the 1st Airborne Brigade, along with officials from the MOFA will travel on the aircraft, in order to assist with the retrieval and transport of evacuees to evacuation points.

Japan Airlines provided ground support services for the aircraft until December 2010, shortly prior to JAL's retirement of its 747 fleet. Since December 2010, these services have been provided by Nippon Cargo Airlines. In July 2019, both aircraft were sold to American company CSDS Asset Management LLC, a subsidiary of CSDS Aircraft Sales & Leasing Inc, based in Rolling Hills Estates, California. 20-1102 became N7477C and 20-1101 is slated to become N7474C. Both aircraft are being considered for Cargo conversion by Bedek/ IAI.

Second generation

While the Boeing 787 was reportedly a leading candidate to replace the 747s at one point due to its fuel efficiency and its large proportion of Japanese components, and the Airbus A350 was also raised as a candidate by some officials, the Ministry of Defense favored the 777 due to its capabilities being closer to those of the 747.

The aircraft were replaced by Boeing 777-300ER aircraft in the fiscal year 2019, with maintenance outsourced to All Nippon Airways. The first 777-300ER arrived at Chitose Air Base to commence testing and training on August 17, 2018, while the second arrived on December 11, 2018.

The Boeing 747-400 were taken out of service, stored at Sapporo for a period of time, then ferried to Marana for short-term storage under new registrations N7474C and N7477C. It is currently being planned to convert the two aircraft to carry cargo.

On August 26, 2021, it was dispatched to Islamabad to help in evacuating vulnerable Afghans.

Specifications

First generation

Model: Boeing 747-47C 
Engine: General Electric CF6-80C2B1F 
Affiliation: Japan Air Self Defense Force, Air Support Group, Special Air Transport Corps
Aircraft number: 20-1101, 20-1102 
Number of aircraft: 2 (usually 2 aircraft are operated as a pair at the same time)
Start of operation: 1993
Retired: March 2019

Second generation
Model: Boeing 777-300ER
Engine: General Electric GE90-115B 
Affiliation: Japan Air Self Defense Force, Air Support Group, Special Air Transport Corps
Aircraft number: 80-1111, 80-1112
Number of aircraft: 2
Start of operation:  April 2019
Status: Operational.

See also

Air transports of heads of state and government

References

Japan Air Self-Defense Force
Air transport of heads of state
Presidential aircraft
Vehicles of Japan
Boeing 747
Boeing 777